Blair is an unincorporated community in Fairfield County, South Carolina, United States. Blair has a post office with ZIP code 29015.

History
The community was named after the local Blair family, who settled there in 1798.

In 1925, Blair had 25 inhabitants.

References

Unincorporated communities in Fairfield County, South Carolina
Unincorporated communities in South Carolina